Johann Major (2 January 1533 – 6 March 1600) was a German Protestant theologian, humanist and poet.

Life 
Major was born in Sankt Joachimsthal in the Kingdom of Bohemia.  He matriculated in 1549 at the University of Wittenberg, and died in Zerbst.

Bibliography 
 Christian Gottlieb Jöcher: Allgemeines Gelehrtenlexikon. Band 3, 1751, Sp. 56
 Heinz Kathe: Die Wittenberger Philosophische Fakultät 1501–1817. Böhlau, Köln 2002, 
 Walter Friedensburg: Geschichte der Universität Wittenberg. Max Niemeyer, Halle (Saale) 1917
 Irene Dingel, Günther Wartenberg: Die Theologische Fakultät Wittenberg 1502 bis 1602. Leipzig 2002, 
 Ulrike Ludwig: Die ehemalige Canzley und Probstey in Wittenberg. Herausgegeben vom Gesundheits- und Tagungszentrum, Wittenberg 2005
 G. Frank: Johann Major der Wittenberger Poet. 1863
 Fritz Roth: Restlose Auswertungen von Leichenpredigten und Personalschriften für genealogische und kulturhistorische Zwecke. Band 5, R 4479
 
 
 Rudolf Wolkan: Böhmens Antheil an der deutschen Litteratur des XVI. Jahrhunderts. K.u.K. Hofbuchdruckerei A. Haase, Prag 1894, S. 136

1533 births
1600 deaths
People from Jáchymov
German Bohemian people
People from the Kingdom of Bohemia
16th-century German Protestant theologians
Philippists
German male non-fiction writers
German poets
German male poets
16th-century German male writers